The Plešivec  is one of the mountains over 1,000 metres high in the Ore Mountains of Central Europe and lies on the territory of the Czech Republic.

Location and surrounding area 
The Plešivec or Pleßberg lies southeast of Abertamy (Abertham) at the most striking escarpment of the Ore Mountains where it drops into the valley of the river Eger. West of the mountain lies the valley of the Bystřice (Wistritz).

Sources 
 Reinhart Heppner/Jörg Brückner/Helmut Schmidt: Sächsisch-böhmische Aussichtsberge des westlichen Erzgebirges in Wort und Bild mit touristischen Angaben. Horb am Neckar 2000, p. 24–26.

Mountains and hills of the Czech Republic
Mountains of the Ore Mountains
One-thousanders of the Czech Republic
Karlovy Vary District